John Kendrick (May 27, 1825 – May 27, 1877) was an American politician.

Kendrick, the only son of the Hon. Green Kendrick (Lieutenant-Governor of Connecticut in 1851) and Anna M. (Leavenworth) Kendrick, was born in Charlotte, N. C., May 27, 1825. In 1829 his father removed from Charlotte to Waterbury, Conn.

He graduated from Yale College in 1843.  After a short business experience in New York City, he studied law for a year with Norton J. Buel, Esq., of Waterbury, and for the next year at (1846-7) at the Yale Law School He did not, however, practice his profession with any regularity until a few years before his death. His residence continued in Waterbury, with the exception of a brief period (about 1859) during which he was an assistant editor of the Daily Register in New Haven.  He represented Waterbury several times in the Connecticut Legislature, was for three terms Mayor of the city of Waterbury, and through his life an active democratic politician. In 1870 he was nominated for US Congress, but was not elected.

He died in Waterbury, May 27, 1877, being on that day 52 years of age. He had been confined to his house for several weeks by rheumatism, which so seriously affected the bones of one leg that an operation was performed and some pieces of the bone removed. Afterwards an artery in the leg burst, and he lived but a few hours.

In October, 1849, he was married to Miss Marian Mair, of Waterbury, who survived him with two of their three children. One son graduated Yale in 1872.

His residence, the John Kendrick House, is now a historical site.

1825 births
1877 deaths
Mayors of Waterbury, Connecticut
Politicians from Charlotte, North Carolina
Yale Law School alumni
Connecticut lawyers
American newspaper editors
Members of the Connecticut General Assembly
19th-century American politicians
Lawyers from Charlotte, North Carolina
19th-century American lawyers